Wymondham Town Football Club is a football club based in England. The club plays at Kings Head Meadow in Wymondham, Norfolk. They play in the Anglian Combination Division One. The club is a FA Charter Standard Club affiliated to the Norfolk County Football Association.

History
The club was founded in 1883. The club played in the local Norwich league, until 1906, when they left to only play friendlies, but three years later the club folded in 1909, with a debt of £2. The club reformed in 1912 when Wymondham Church Lads took over the club's name and the club played in a local Norwich league. In 1935 the club joined the East Anglian League.

After the War the club joined the Norfolk & Suffolk League in 1946. The 1950–51 season saw the club enter the FA Cup for the first time, something they did for the next five seasons. When the Norfolk & Suffolk League merged with the East Anglian League to form the Anglian Combination in 1964, the club were placed in Section B of the new league. The club won the Division one championship five times in the Anglian Combination, each time gaining promotion to the premier division, but spending no more than four seasons in a row in the top division.

Ground

The club plays its home games at King's Head Meadow.  since their formation in 1883.

Honours
Anglian Combination
 Division One Champions (5) 1970–71, 1981–82, 1985–86, 1990–91, 2017–18

Norfolk Senior Cup
 Winners (2) 1887–88, 1888–89

See also
Wymondham Town F.C. players

References

External links

FA Full-time

Football clubs in England
Football clubs in Norfolk
Anglian Combination
Norfolk & Suffolk League
Wymondham, Norfolk
1883 establishments in England
Association football clubs established in 1883